James Malett B.D. (d. 1543) was a Canon of Windsor from 1514 to 1543.

Career

He was educated at Queens' College, Cambridge where he graduated BA in 1497, MA in 1501, and BD in 1509.

He was appointed:
Chaplain to Henry VIII's first wife, Queen Katherine of Aragon
Vicar of Burnham, Buckinghamshire 1504
Rector of Great Leighs, Essex 1514 - 1542
Prebendary of Lincoln Cathedral 1519 - 1542
Rector of Leadenham, Lincolnshire 1542 - 1543
Precentor of Lincoln Cathedral 1553 - 1538
Master of the Hospital of St. Giles’, High Wycombe, Buckinghamshire

He was appointed to the eleventh stall in St George's Chapel, Windsor Castle in 1514 and held this until he died in 1543.

He was executed in 1543 at Chelmsford for remarks about the suppression of the monasteries.

Notes 

1543 deaths
Canons of Windsor
Alumni of Queens' College, Cambridge
People executed under Henry VIII
Year of birth missing